Rusty Warren (March 20, 1930 – May 25, 2021) was an American comedian and singer, specializing in sex-related themes and such songs as "Bounce Your Boobies" and "Knockers Up!".

Early life
Warren was born in New York City in 1930 and adopted six months later by Helen and Herbert Goldman, a couple from Milton, Massachusetts, who named her Ilene Goldman. She graduated from Milton High School around 1948, studied piano at the New England Conservatory of Music, graduating around 1954. She spent her first free summer entertaining in small lounges, and later taught there briefly after obtaining her degree. Her musical mentor at the time was Arthur Fiedler, the conductor of the Boston Pops.

Career
She recorded for Jubilee Records, then GNP Crescendo Records which reissued some of her earlier Jubilee albums. Known as the "Knockers Up Gal", she has frequently been called the "mother of the sexual revolution". Her career began in the early 1950s in Phoenix, Arizona. Later she moved her act to Las Vegas, Nevada. Her comedy routines exposed the subject of sex from a female perspective. Her most famous contribution to the sexual revolution was the song "Knockers Up" from the 1960 album of the same name.

SCTV comedian Catherine O'Hara performed a character called Dusty Towne who was based on Warren.

Personal life
Label GNP Crescendo produced a DVD that chronicles her life in show business. The DVD, Rusty Warren: Knockers Up! The Lady Behind the Laughs, was released by GNP Crescendo in 2008. Her life partner was Elizabeth Rizzo from 1984 to 2019 and they resided in Hawaii after moving from Paradise Valley, Arizona. Rizzo wrote Rusty's biography, Rusty Warren - The Knockers Up Gal, available on Amazon. It contains excerpts from news articles and magazine articles in chronological order to tell the story of Rusty's career and those who worked with her. Rusty and her entourage saved every news article, photograph, slides, reels of video footage from her Las Vegas shows, magazines, promotional material, letters, performance contracts, handwritten notes—everything pertaining to her career as a comedian spanning from 1955 through the late 1980s. The Rusty Warren collection is in the archives of the Library of Congress and on display at the National Comedy Museum.

Rusty Warren died in her sleep on May 25, 2021, at the age of 91.

Discography

Albums
Songs for Sinners – Jubilee JGM 2024  (1959)
Knockers Up! – Jubilee JGM 2029  (1960)
Sin-sational – Jubilee JGM 2034  (1961)
Rusty Warren Bounces Back – Jubilee JGM 2039  (1961)
Rusty Warren in Orbit – Jubilee JGM 2044  (1962)
Banned in Boston? – Jubilee JGM 2049  (1963)
Sex-x-ponent – Jubilee JGM 2054  (1964)
Rusty Sings a Portrait of Life – Jubilee JGS 5025  (1964)
More Knockers Up! – Jubilee JGM 2059  (1965)
Rusty Rides Again – Jubilee JGM 2064  (1967)
Bottoms Up! – Jubilee JGM 2069  (1969)
Look What I Got for You – Jubilee JGS 2074  (1969)
Lays It on the Line – GNP-Crescendo GNPS-2081  (1974)
Knockers Up '76 – GNP-Crescendo GNPS-2088  (1976)
Sexplosion – GNP-Crescendo GNPS-2114  (1977)

Singles
•	"Knockers Up" / "Basin Street" / "Bounce Your Boobies" / "Shimmy Like My Sister Kate" – Jubilee 45-2039 (1961)
•	"Roll Me Over" / Do It Now / "Twist Blues" – Jubilee 45-2049 (1962)
•	"I Like Everybody" / "Waltz Me Around Again Willie" / "Greenback Dollar" / "The Sexy Life" – Jubilee 45-2059 (1963)
•	"The Pill Song" / "Surprise" / "Red River Sally" / "Steel Drivin' Man" – Jubilee 45-2069 (1964)

Reissued Digitally by Elizabeth Rizzo Publishing in 2022 on these digital music platforms:

Amazon Music/ 	 	
Spotify/ 
YouTube Music/ 	 	
iTunes - Apple Music – US/ 	 	
Amazon US Premium Service/ 	
Resso/ 		
Apple Music/ 	
Pandora Radio/ 	
Amazon UK Premium Service/ 	
Pandora Premium/ 	
Amazon Premium ROW/ 	
TikTok/ 	
iHeartRadio/ 	
Boomplay/ 		
Snapchat/ 	
Pandora Plus/ 	 
Amazon Prime IN/ 		
Apple iTunes/ 	
iTunes-UK/ 	
iTunes-Australia/ 	
Amazon MP3-UK/ 		
Deezer/ 		
iTunes Match-Americas/
Tidal/ 
iTunes-Apple Music-Canada/  	
Apple Music-Europe/ 	 	
iTunes-Apple Music New Zealand/ 	
iTunes- Apple Music - United Kingdom/ 
Amazon AT Premium Service/ 
iTunes Apple -other territories/ 	
Tencent Music Entertainment-TME/ 	
Amazon US AD supported/ 
Amazon EU Ad Supported/ 	
iTunes Match/ 
iTunes Match AWA/ 	
Amazon IT Premium Service/
MediaNet/ 	
iTunes-Canada/ 
Qobuz/ 	
NetEase Cloud Music/
Trebel/ 
Saavn/ 
SoundExchange /
iTunes Match-Canada/
Apple Music - Australia/ 
Apple Music-Japan/ 
Amazon JP Premium Service/

"Roll Me Over" / Do It Now / "Twist Blues" 
    "I Like Everybody" / "Waltz Me Around Again Willie" / "Greenback Dollar" / "The Sexy Life" /
    "The Pill Song" / "Surprise" / "Red River Sally" / "Steel Drivin' Man"

Singles
"Knockers Up" / "Basin Street" / "Bounce Your Boobies" / "Shimmy Like My Sister Kate" – Jubilee 45-2039  (1961)
"Roll Me Over" / Do It Now / "Twist Blues" – Jubilee 45-2049  (1962)
"I Like Everybody" / "Waltz Me Around Again Willie" / "Greenback Dollar" / "The Sexy Life" – Jubilee 45-2059  (1963)
"The Pill Song" / "Surprise" / "Red River Sally" / "Steel Drivin' Man" – Jubilee 45-2069  (1964)

References

External links

 Rusty Warren at iTunes
 
 
 

 Rusty Warren - Topic YouTube

1930 births
2021 deaths
American adoptees
Jewish American musicians
Jubilee Records artists
Musicians from Massachusetts
Musicians from New York City
American LGBT musicians
People from Milton, Massachusetts
American women comedians
GNP Records artists
Nightclub performers
21st-century American Jews
21st-century American women